"Groovin' High" is a 1945 jazz standard by Dizzy Gilespie.

Groovin' High may also refer to:
 Groovin' High (Dizzy Gillespie album), 1955
 Groovin' High (Booker Ervin album), 1966
 Groovin' High (Hank Jones album), 1978
 Groovin' High (Kenny Burrell album), 1981